Sebu Kuhlberg (born 24 January 1974) is a Finnish snowboarder. He competed in the men's halfpipe event at the 1998 Winter Olympics.

References

1974 births
Living people
Finnish male snowboarders
Olympic snowboarders of Finland
Snowboarders at the 1998 Winter Olympics
Sportspeople from Helsinki